Eschenbach may refer to:

Places

Germany
Eschenbach (Göppingen), Göppingen district, Baden-Württemberg
Eschenbach in der Oberpfalz, Neustadt (Waldnaab) district, Bavaria
Eschenbach, Pommelsbrunn, a borough of Pommelsbrunn, Nürnberger Land, Bavaria
Windischeschenbach, Neustadt (Waldnaab) district, Bavaria
Wolframs-Eschenbach, Ansbach district, Bavaria

Switzerland
Eschenbach, Lucerne, Hochdorf district, Canton of Lucerne
Eschenbach, St. Gallen, See-Gaster Constituency, Canton of St. Gallen

People
Eschenbach (surname)

See also
Eschbach (disambiguation)